Tara L. Lemméy is an American entrepreneur, inventor, designer, technology expert, and innovation strategist. She is CEO and founder of LENS Ventures, an innovation and investment firm based in San Francisco. Lemméy was named one of the 100 Most Creative People in Business in 2013 by Fast Company (magazine) and one of the MCP 1000: The Most Creative People in Business. She is an inventor with over seventy US and international utility and design patents.

Innovation and economic policy
Lemméy is a member of Rework America, the Markle Economic Future Initiative created by the Markle Foundation to invent new strategies and scalable solutions for jobs, broad participation in economic prosperity, economic security and growth in America. Lemméy is a co-author of America’s Moment. Creating Opportunity in the Connected Age (2015), a book by Rework America.

Lemméy has spoken on risk and innovation — at DO USA, Techonomy, TED India, Fortune Brainstorm Tech, Future in Review, Digital Media and Learning Conference, and has been published in Wired, Business Week, and the Harvard Business Review.

Lemméy is CEO and Founder of LENS, an innovation and investment firm that works with institutions in creating next markets. She was an early advisor to Nest Labs and CEO Tony Fadell, led the strategy for Ribbit acquired by British Telecom, and served on the board of Discovery Mining acquired by Interwoven, now part of HP. Lemméy was CEO and founder of Net Power & Light, a developer of patented technology for high-fidelity video collaboration and live experiences in sports, entertainment, education, and healthcare.

Lemméy was profiled in The Power of Pull: How Small Moves, Smartly Made, Can Set Big Things in Motion (John Hagel III, John Seely Brown and Lang Davison), in 2010 (Bloomberg BusinessWeek). She is a regular participant at the Aspen Institute, contributing to "Solving the Dilbert Paradox" a report from the Aspen Round Table on Talent Development. She was the Founding Chair of Policy, Law & Ethics at Singularity University and has been a visiting lecturer at Stanford, Harvard, MIT, Columbia, and U.C. Berkeley.

National security, technology and privacy 
Lemméy served as a co-chair of the Technology Working Group on the Markle Foundation's Task Force on National Security in the Information Age and was the lead architect of the SHARE information environment recommendation which became the ISE, the new way of information sharing for the intelligence and national security community post 9/11.

Lemméy was on the U.S. Department of Homeland Security Privacy Advisory Committee, which provides external expert advice to the Department's Secretary and the Chief Privacy Officer on matters relating to privacy and civil liberties preservation in relation to national security improvements. Earlier, Lemméy was President of the Electronic Frontier Foundation  and was a member of the founding board of TRUSTe.

Public diplomacy 
Lemméy has collaborated with the United States Department of State on public diplomacy and outreach programs around the world with her speaking tours on entrepreneurship, innovation, and economic growth, most recently in Switzerland and Turkey. In 2009 she was part of the U.S. State Department's Technology Delegation to Mexico, which explored ways for U.S. technology companies to support Mexican citizens’ resistance against the country's drug cartels.

In 2010 she was a delegate to the White House Council on Women and Girls Women's Entrepreneurship Conference, which was formed to address critical challenges and opportunities and identify public policy initiatives needed to move the women's business agendas forward. Previously, Lemméy was a Commissioner on the Embassy of the Future Task Force at the Center for Strategic and International Studies as the "Ambassador from Silicon Valley" contributing to the commission's Report that provided key recommendations for making the diplomatic pursuit of U.S. interests abroad more effective in the 21st century.

Future of learning and higher education
Lemméy created DGREE.ORG — an initiative funded by the Lumina Foundation to envision the future of higher education and exploring how technology and innovation can drive new models for student-centered, lifetime learning. In 2010 Lemméy hosted the DGREE Summit which brought together business leaders, venture capitalists, education foundations, and university leaders and accreditors to focus on student-centric learning in a sustainable educational ecosystem. Lemméy has collaborated with Harvard Professor Michael Sandel to create a Global Classroom to pioneer the use of mobile technology and mobile video for global live debates about justice, rights, and democracy. The series of live experiences in the fall semester of 2012 brought together students of Sandel's course Justice with those in China, India, Japan and Brazil, featuring a guest appearance by philosopher Peter Singer joining the Harvard audience in Sanders Theater live from New York. The video recordings of the Global Classroom experiment were featured in Sandel's EdX massive open online course in 2013. The Global Classroom experiment was covered by the BBC, Fast Company and was recognized by ComputerWorld's 2013 Honors award program.

Health and integrative medicine
Lemméy is part of the leadership team at the Arizona Center for Integrative Medicine of the University of Arizona, with her role at the Center focused on innovation. Lemméy has collaborated with Andrew Weil and Victoria Maizes on Public Forum on nutrition and health, part of the center's annual Nutrition and Health Conference. Lemméy moderated the Public Forum on “Food and Health: Public Policy and Personal Choice” with Weil, Robert Lustig and Michael Pollan, held in 2011 in San Francisco.

Awards and honors
 Fast Company MCP 1000: Most Creative People in Business
 Fast Company 100 Most Creative People in Business in 2013
 2013 ComputerWorld Honors Laureates (Mobile Access)

References

Living people
21st-century American inventors
American designers
American technology company founders
American technology chief executives
American women chief executives
American women company founders
American educators
Business speakers
Women inventors
American venture capitalists
American women investors
Private equity and venture capital investors
Year of birth missing (living people)
21st-century American businesswomen
21st-century American businesspeople